Chromis multilineata is a species of fish in the family Pomacentridae. It is commonly known as the brown chromis. It is found in the western Atlantic Ocean from the southern United States south to Brazil and in the eastern Atlantic off St Helena and Ascension Island

References

External links
 

multilineata
Fish described in 1853